Osteomeles schwerinae is a species of plant native to China. Its flowers are white and resemble those of hawthorn species. It produces small, white, round berries that are pomes. The fruits are edible and can be eaten raw or used to make jellies and jams. The fruits have a sweet flavor. It is grown in gardens as an ornamental plant. It is also used in bonsai. O. schwerinae can be found in mainland China and Taiwan.

References

External links
Information from Plants for a Future
 Information from Gardening.eu

schwerinae
Flora of China